The 2000 Chevy Silverado 200 was a NASCAR Craftsman Truck Series race held on July 15, 2000. It was known for being the last NASCAR race broadcast by CBS. Dennis Setzer lead 30 laps and won. Mike Joy, Buddy Baker, and Ned Jarrett called the action.

Results

References

NASCAR races at Nazareth Speedway